The Japanese Era Rangoon General Hospital: Memoir of A Wartime Physician is a memoir written by Myint Swe, first published in 1967. It chronicles the events at the only hospital in Yangon (Rangoon) open to non-Japanese during the Japanese occupation of Burma. The book includes the author's eyewitness accounts of hardship and struggles at the makeshift hospital as well as several key people of the era that were treated there, including: Aung San, Ne Win, Bo Letya, Bo Setkya, Thakin Than Tun, Thakin Mya, Ba Cho, Kyaw Nyein, Thakin Po Hla Gyi, Lanmadaw Po Tok, S. C. Bose, and J. R. Bhonsle.

The first edition won the Burma National Literature Award, 2nd Prize for 1967. The second edition of the book was published in 1968, and includes a few more sections. The second edition has been reprinted two times (2010 and 2015), and translated into English (2014).

Publishing history
Myint Swe recounted in the book how he came to write the book. He wrote that he had always recounted the stories at the wartime hospital to countless friends and colleagues over the years, and that upon the repeated urging of Myint Oo, editor of Shaytho Magazine, he finally began writing his first ever book in 1966.

In Burmese
 1st edition (1967)
 2nd edition (1968)
 2nd edition, 2nd printing (2010)
 2nd edition, 3rd printing (2015)

Translations
 1st edition, in English, as weekly serials in The Working People's Daily (1967–68?), not completed
 2nd edition, in English, (2014)

Notes

References

Bibliography
 
 
 

Burmese literature
Burmese-language books
Books about Myanmar
1967 non-fiction books
Memoirs